Kazachstania is an extinct genus of Devonian-aged trilobites in the order Phacopida. It contains one species, K. gerardoi and has been found in Bolivia and Kazakhstan.

External links
 Kazachstania at the Paleobiology Database

Dalmanitidae